A chelaalso called a claw, nipper, or pinceris a pincer-like organ at the end of certain limbs of some arthropods. The name comes from Ancient Greek , through New Latin . The plural form is chelae. Legs bearing a chela are called chelipeds. Another name is claw because most chelae are curved and have a sharp point like a claw.

Chelae can be present at the tips of arthropod legs as well as their pedipalps. Chelae are distinct from spider chelicerae in that they do not contain venomous glands and cannot distribute venom.

See also
 Pincer (biology)
 Pincer (tool)

References

Arthropod anatomy